Pseudohemihyalea asignata is a moth in the family Erebidae. It was described by Reich in 1938. It is found in Costa Rica.

References

Moths described in 1938
asignata